There is also a church of San Lorenzo in Carmignano near Foggia.

San Lorenzo is a romanesque-style, Roman Catholic rural parish church located on Via Montalbiolo #51 in the town of Carmignano, province of Prato, region of Tuscany, Italy.

History

The stone church was erected in the 12th century, perhaps under the patronage of Countess Matilde di Canossa. It underwent modifications in the 16th and 17th centuries. Among the interior paintings is a canvas depicting St Lawrence (1605) by Giovanni Bizzelli. The main altarpiece is a Madonna and Child with Saints (1670) attributed to Simone Pignoni.

References

12th-century Roman Catholic church buildings in Italy
Romanesque architecture in Carmignano
Roman Catholic churches in Tuscany
Churches in the province of Prato